The Northern Territory is one of the Australia's territories, and has established several territorial symbols and emblems.

Official symbols

See also
 List of symbols of states and territories of Australia
 Australian state colours

References

External links
 Official Symbols - Northern Territory Government